The daytime talk show Live with Kelly and Ryan, starring Kelly Ripa and Ryan Seacrest, officially debuted on May 1, 2017, but is a continuation of the series that previously co-starred Regis Philbin or Michael Strahan.

Note: Although the co-hosts may have read a couple of emails during the broadcast, it does not necessarily count as an "Inbox" segment.

Live with Regis and Kathie Lee (1988–2000)

Live with Regis (2000–01)

Live with Regis and Kelly (2001–11)

Live with Kelly – first era (2011–12)

Live with Kelly and Michael (2012–16)

Live with Kelly –  second era (2016–17)

Live with Kelly and Ryan (2017–present)

References

Lists of American non-fiction television series episodes